The Defense of Marriage Coalition (sometimes styled Oregon Defense of Marriage Coalition to distinguish itself from similar organizations in other states) is a citizens' political organization support the definition of marriage as the union of one man and one woman.  It was organized in 2004 by the Oregon Family Council as a campaign first to place Oregon Ballot Measure 36 (2004) before the voters by initiative petition, and then once signatures were collected, as a campaign for its passage.  The organization formed a coalition of 1,500 churches and collected a record 244,000 signatures to place the amendment on the ballot.

See also 

Basic Rights Oregon

References

External links 
Official website

Political advocacy groups in the United States
Politics of Oregon
Organizations established in 2004
2004 establishments in Oregon